Peißenberg Nord station is a railway station in the municipality of Peißenberg, in Bavaria, Germany. It is located on the Weilheim–Peißenberg line of Deutsche Bahn.

Services
 the following services stop at Peißenberg Nord:

References

External links
 
 Peißenberg Nord layout 
 

Railway stations in Bavaria
Buildings and structures in Weilheim-Schongau